Jyoti Sunita Kullu (born 9 September 1978 in Sundargarh, Odisha) is a female field hockey player from India, who made her international debut for her native country in 1996 in Delhi at the Indira Gandhi Gold Cup. In 2002, she became the topscorer of the Champions Challenge tournament in Johannesburg, South Africa, with five goals in six matches. In the same year Kullu won the golden medal with India at the 2002 Commonwealth Games in Manchester, England.

International Senior Tournaments
 1996 – Indira Gandhi Gold Cup, New Delhi
 1997 – World Cup Qualifier, Harare (4th)
 1998 – World Cup, Utrecht (12th)
 1998 – Commonwealth Games, Kuala Lumpur (4th)
 1998 – Asian Games, Bangkok (2nd)
 1999 – Hockey Asia Cup, New Delhi (2nd)
 2000 – Olympic Qualifier, Milton Keynes (10th)
 2001 – World Cup Qualifier, Amiens/Abbeville (7th)
 2002 – Champions Challenge, Johannesburg (3rd)
 2002 – Commonwealth Games, Manchester (1st)
 2002 – Asian Games, Busan (4th)
 2003 – Afro-Asian Games, Hyderabad (1st)
 2004 – Hockey Asia Cup, New Delhi (1st)
 2006 – Commonwealth Games, Melbourne (2nd)
 2006 – World Cup, Madrid (11th)

Awards

 Arjuna Award, 2007

References

External links
Commonwealth Games Biography

1978 births
Living people
People from Sundergarh district
Recipients of the Arjuna Award
Field hockey players from Odisha
Sportswomen from Odisha
Indian female field hockey players
Field hockey players at the 1998 Commonwealth Games
Field hockey players at the 2002 Commonwealth Games
Field hockey players at the 2006 Commonwealth Games
Commonwealth Games gold medallists for India
Asian Games medalists in field hockey
Field hockey players at the 1998 Asian Games
Field hockey players at the 2002 Asian Games
Field hockey players at the 2006 Asian Games
Asian Games silver medalists for India
Asian Games bronze medalists for India
Commonwealth Games medallists in field hockey
21st-century Indian women
21st-century Indian people
Medalists at the 1998 Asian Games
Medalists at the 2006 Asian Games
Medallists at the 2002 Commonwealth Games
Medallists at the 2006 Commonwealth Games